Scoparia perplexella is a species of moth in the family Crambidae. It is found in Greece, the Republic of Macedonia, Croatia and on Sardinia.

References

Moths described in 1839
Scorparia
Moths of Europe
Moths of Asia